This is a list of the main career statistics of Australian tennis player, Lleyton Hewitt. To date, Hewitt has won thirty ATP singles titles including two grand slam singles titles, two ATP Masters 1000 singles titles and two year-ending championships. He was also the runner-up at the 2004 Tennis Masters Cup, 2004 US Open and 2005 Australian Open. Hewitt was first ranked World No. 1 by the Association of Tennis Professionals (ATP) on November 19, 2001.

Records and career milestones 
In 1997, aged 15 years and 11 months, Hewitt qualified for the Australian Open, becoming the youngest qualifier in the event's history. The following year, Hewitt (ranked World No. 550 at the time) upset Andre Agassi en route to winning his first ATP singles title at the Next Generation Adelaide International, becoming the third youngest player to win an ATP singles title after Aaron Krickstein and Michael Chang and the lowest ranked ATP singles champion in history. In 2000, Hewitt became the first teenager since Pete Sampras to claim four singles titles in the same season when he won titles in Adelaide, Sydney, Scottsdale and Queen's. His victory at the latter event also meant that he had now won at least one singles title on each playing surface (hard, clay and grass). In September, Hewitt reached his first grand slam semi-final at the US Open, losing to Sampras in straight sets but won his first grand slam title of any sort by winning the doubles event with Max Mirnyi, thus becoming the youngest player (at 19 years and 6 months) to win a grand slam doubles title in the Open era. In November, he reached his first ATP Masters 1000 final in Stuttgart before finishing his season with a round robin loss at the year-ending Tennis Masters Cup, an event which he had qualified for the first time in his career. Hewitt finished the year ranked World No. 7, marking his first finish in the year-end top ten.

In June 2001, Hewitt reached his first quarterfinal at the French Open, losing to Juan Carlos Ferrero in straight sets before going on to win his first grand slam singles title at the US Open, defeating Pete Sampras in the final in straight sets. In November, he won his first year-end championship at the Tennis Masters Cup, becoming the first Australian player to do so and as a result, became the World No. 1 for the first time in his career. Aged 20 years and 8 months at the time, Hewitt was the youngest male to have reached the summit of the ATP Singles Rankings until Carlos Alcaraz achieved this at age 19 in 2022. He finished the year with a tour leading win-loss record of 80–18; six singles titles (tied with Gustavo Kuerten for most titles won this season) and the year-end No. 1 ranking, which was another first for a male Australian player.

After a disappointing start to the 2002 season, Hewitt embarked on a 15-match winning streak, collecting titles in San Jose and Indian Wells, defeating Andre Agassi and Tim Henman respectively before losing in the semi-finals of the NASDAQ–100 Open to Roger Federer, a loss which also ended his 23–match winning streak in American tournaments. Hewitt's match with Agassi was "considered by many to be the year's best final on the ATP World Tour" whilst his triumph over Henman gave him his first ATP Masters 1000 title. In June, Hewitt won his second grand slam singles title at the Wimbledon Championships, defeating first time grand slam finalist David Nalbandian in the championship match before finishing as runner-up to Carlos Moyá at the Cincinnati Masters and ending his US Open title defence with a four set semi-final loss to Agassi. In November, he reached his third ATP Masters 1000 final of the year at the Paris Masters (losing to Marat Safin) then successfully defended his title at the year-ending Tennis Masters Cup, defeating Juan Carlos Ferrero in a five set final lasting 3 hours and 51 minutes. Hewitt finished the year ranked World No. 1 for the second consecutive season, becoming the seventh player to do so and the fourth player to remain at the top of the ATP Singles Rankings for an entire year. He won more singles matches (61) and ATP Masters 1000 matches (23) than any other player this year and tied Agassi for the most singles titles won this season with five. He served a career-best 536 aces throughout the season, led his peers in terms of return games won and points won on his first serve and also earned $4,619,38 in prize money, which remains the highest amount he has earned in a single season.

2003 was a relatively disappointing season for Hewitt as he lost the World No. 1 ranking after spending seventy-five consecutive weeks at the top spot and ended his Wimbledon title defence with a first round loss to Ivo Karlović, thus becoming the first player since Manuel Santana in 1967 to fail to defend their title by losing in the first round of the event. However, he successfully defended his title at the Pacific Life Open (becoming the first player to do so since Michael Chang from 1997–1998), reached his fourth consecutive quarterfinal at the US Open (losing to eventual runner-up, Juan Carlos Ferrero in four sets) and led Australia to victory in the Davis Cup (defeating Roger Federer in a memorable five set match en route).

Hewitt returned to form the following year, equalling his career-best of reaching seven singles finals in the one season and compiling his best ever single-season win-loss record in grand slam singles play (17–4). In May, he reached his second quarterfinal at the French Open, losing to the eventual champion Gastón Gaudio in straight sets before reaching his second consecutive grand slam quarterfinal at the Wimbledon Championships where he lost to the World No. 1 and defending champion, Roger Federer in four sets. He also enjoyed a stellar US Open series campaign as he reached his second final at the Cincinnati Masters and won titles in Washington D.C. and Long Island respectively before reaching his second US Open final and third grand slam singles final where he lost to Federer in straight sets. He finished the year by reaching his third final at the year-ending Tennis Masters Cup, once again losing to Federer and ended the year ranked World No. 3. Hewitt began the 2005 season by winning his fourth title at the Medibank International, becoming the first player to win that many titles at the event since John Bromwich in 1940 before defeating Rafael Nadal, David Nalbandian and Andy Roddick en route to his first Australian Open final where he lost in four sets to Marat Safin. By reaching the final, Hewitt had now reached the quarterfinals or better at all four grand slam events and had also become the first male Australian player to reach the Australian Open singles final since Pat Cash in 1988. The remainder of Hewitt's year was highlighted by a finals appearance at the Pacific Life Open and semi-final appearances at the Wimbledon Championships and US Open; he lost on all three occasions to the World No. 1, Roger Federer. Hewitt qualified for the year-ending Tennis Masters Cup for the fifth time in his career but withdrew from the event as his wife was due to give birth to their first child. He ended the year ranked World No. 4, which remains his last finish in the year-end top ten.

In later years, most of Hewitt's best results have come at grass court tournaments, although he did reach the quarterfinals of the 2009 Cincinnati Masters and also won the 2014 Brisbane International, defeating Roger Federer in the final. At the 2009 Wimbledon Championships, Hewitt defeated Juan Martín del Potro en route to his first grand slam quarterfinal in three years where he lost in five sets to the eventual runner-up, Andy Roddick. The following year, Hewitt recovered from a set down to defeat Federer in the final of the Gerry Weber Open, thus ending his 15-match losing streak against the Swiss dating back to 2003. Between July 2012 and July 2014, Hewitt reached three consecutive finals at the Hall of Fame Open, losing to John Isner and Nicolas Mahut respectively before winning the title for the first time with a three set win over Ivo Karlović.

Performance timelines

Singles

1 Held as Hamburg Masters (outdoor clay) until 2008, Madrid Masters (outdoor clay) 2009 – present.
2 Held as Stuttgart Masters (indoor hard) until 2001, Madrid Masters (indoor hard) from 2002 to 2008, and Shanghai Masters (outdoor hard) 2009 – present.

Doubles

1 Held as Hamburg Masters (outdoor clay) until 2008, Madrid Masters (outdoor clay) 2009 – present.
2 Held as Stuttgart Masters (indoor hard) until 2001, Madrid Masters (indoor hard) from 2002 to 2008, and Shanghai Masters (outdoor hard) 2009 – present.

Significant finals

Grand Slam tournaments

Singles: 4 (2 titles, 2 runner-ups)

Doubles: 1 (1 title)

Mixed doubles: 1 (1 runner-up)

Year-end championship finals

Singles: 3 (2 titles, 1 runner-up)

Masters 1000 finals

Singles: 7 (2 titles, 5 runner-ups)

ATP career finals

Singles: 46 (30 titles, 16 runner-ups)

Doubles: 8 (3 titles, 5 runner-ups)

ATP Challenger finals

Singles: 1 (1–0)

Doubles: 3 (2–1)

ATP Tour career earnings

* Statistics correct .

Head-to-head record vs. top-10 ranked players
Hewitt's record against players who held a top 10 ranking, with those who reached No. 1 in bold

 Tim Henman 9–1
 Roger Federer 9–18
 James Blake 8–1
 Jonas Björkman 7–0
 Jürgen Melzer 7–0
 Arnaud Clément 7–1
 Yevgeny Kafelnikov 7–1
 Tommy Haas 7–4
 Carlos Moyá 7–5
 Andy Roddick 7–7
 Marat Safin 7–7
 Albert Costa 6–1
 Thomas Enqvist 6–1
 Jiří Novák 6–1
 Guillermo Cañas 6–2
 Sébastien Grosjean 6–3
 Juan Carlos Ferrero 6–4
 Thomas Johansson 5–1
 Paradorn Srichaphan 5–1
 Mikhail Youzhny 5–2
 Pete Sampras 5–4
 Nikolay Davydenko 4–0
 John Isner 4–2
 Magnus Norman 4–2
 Gastón Gaudio 4–3
 Greg Rusedski 4–3
 Andre Agassi 4–4
 Rafael Nadal 4–7
 Goran Ivanišević 3–0
 Nicolas Kiefer 3–0
 Gustavo Kuerten 3–1
 Todd Martin 3–1
 Mark Philippoussis 3–1
 Patrick Rafter 3–1
 Radek Štěpánek 3–1
 Marcos Baghdatis 3–2
 Juan Martín del Potro 3–2
 Wayne Ferreira 3–2
 Cédric Pioline 3–2
 Marcelo Ríos 3–2
 Robin Söderling 3–2
 Janko Tipsarević 3–2
 Àlex Corretja 3–3
 David Nalbandian 3–3
 Michael Chang 2–0
 Guillermo Coria 2–0
 Richard Gasquet 2–0
 Magnus Gustafsson 2–0
 Nicolás Massú 2–0
 Kei Nishikori 2–0
 Karol Kučera 2–1
 Mardy Fish 2–2
 Nicolás Lapentti 2–2
 Gaël Monfils 2–2
 Stan Wawrinka 2–2
 Rainer Schüttler 2–3
 Fernando González 2–5
 Mario Ančić 1–0
 Grigor Dimitrov 1–0
 Richard Krajicek 1–0
 Magnus Larsson 1–0
 Ivan Ljubičić 1–0
 Juan Mónaco 1–0
 Mariano Puerta 1–0
 Marc Rosset 1–0
 Jack Sock 1–0
 Marin Čilić 1–1
 Joachim Johansson 1–1
 Milos Raonic 1–1
 Tommy Robredo 1–1
 Nicolás Almagro 1–2
 Kevin Anderson 1–2
 David Ferrer 1–3
 Novak Djokovic 1–6
 Boris Becker 0–1
 Sergi Bruguera 0–1
 Félix Mantilla 0–1
 Andriy Medvedev 0–1
 Andy Murray 0–1
 Fabio Fognini 0–2
 Tomáš Berdych 0–3
 Gilles Simon 0–4
 Jo-Wilfried Tsonga 0–4

Top-10 wins per season
Hewitt has a 65–73 (47.1%) record against players who were, at the time the match was played, ranked in the top 10.

National representation

Team competition finals: 7 (3 titles, 4 runner-ups)

Davis Cup  (59–21)

References

External links
 
 
 

Hewitt, Lleyton